The 2000–01 Czech 1.liga season was the eighth season of the Czech 1.liga, the second level of ice hockey in the Czech Republic. 14 teams participated in the league, and KHL Chomutov won the championship.

Regular season

Playoffs

Quarterfinals 
 KLH Chomutov – IHC Písek 3:0 (5:1, 4:0, 2:0)
 HC Liberec – HC Beroun 3:1 (3:2 P, 3:0, 3:4, 5:2)
 HC Dukla Jihlava – SK Horácká Slavia Třebíč 3:0 (4:2, 5:0, 3:2)
 HC Rosice – HC Prostějov 3:1 (4:1, 4:3, 3:5, 4:1)

Semifinals 
 KLH Chomutov – HC Rosice 3:1 (1:2 SN, 8:0, 2:1, 4:1)
 HC Liberec – HC Dukla Jihlava 3:2 (2:4, 3:0, 2:0, 1:2 SN, 4:2)

Final 
 KLH Chomutov – HC Liberec 3:0 (5:4 P, 5:2, 2:1 P)

Qualification

Relegation

External links
 Season on hockeyarchives.info

2000–01 in Czech ice hockey
Czech
Czech 1. Liga seasons